Paul Malone Allen (born September 1951) is an American cellular immunologist and current Robert L. Kroc Professor of Pathology and Immunology at Washington University School of Medicine in Saint Louis, Missouri. Allen holds prestigious MERIT status with the National Institutes of Health.

Education and career
Paul Allen received his bachelor's degree in 1974 from the University of Michigan followed by a master's degree in 1977 and a doctoral degree in 1981 with John Niederhuber and a thesis titled "Functional and serological examination of the central portion of the I region of the H-2 gene complex", both from the University of Michigan. He completed a pathology research fellowship at Harvard Medical School with Emil Unanue and joined the Washington University faculty in 1985.

From 2005 to 2006, Allen served as the president of the American Association of Immunologists. He is a member of the editorial board for Immunity.

Research
Allen's work specializes in the study of how T lymphocytes recognize antigens and initiate an immune response. He and Emil R. Unanue were responsible for the discovery that antigen-presenting cells present antigens to bind to a special group of molecules known as the major histocompatibility complex.

Notable works

Wipke BT, Allen PM (2001). Essential role of neutrophils in the initiation and progression of a murine model of rheumatoid arthritis. Journal of Immunology. 167(3): pgs. 1601-1608
Kersh EN, Shaw AS, Allen PM (1998). Fidelity of T cell activation through multistep T cell receptor ζ phosphorylation. Science. 281(5376): pgs. 572-575
Kersh GJ, Allen PM (1996). Essential flexibility in the T-cell recognition of antigen. Nature. 380(6574): pgs. 495-498
Sloan-Lancaster J, Shaw AS... Allen PM (1994). Partial T cell signalling: Altered phospho-ζ and lack of zap70 recruitment in APL-induced T cell anergy. Cell. 79(5): pgs. 913-922
Sloan-Lancaster J, Evavold BD, Allen PM (1993). Induction of T-cell anergy by altered T-cell-receptor ligand on live antigen-presenting cells. Nature. 363(6425): pgs. 156-159
Evavold BD, Allen PM (1991). Separation of IL-4 production from Th cell proliferation by an altered T cell receptor ligand. Science. 252(5010): pgs. 1308-1310
Unanue ER, Allen PM (1987). The basis for the immunoregulatory role of macrophages and other accessory cells. Science. 236(4801): pgs. 551-557

References

Living people
21st-century American biologists
American immunologists
Washington University in St. Louis faculty
1951 births
University of Michigan alumni